Multisparsidae is a family of bryozoans belonging to the order Cyclostomatida.

Genera:
 Collapora Quenstedt, 1881
 Entalophora Androsova, 1968
 Heterohaplooecia Voigt & Viaud, 1983
 Multisparsa d'Orbigny, 1853
 Patulopora Taylor & Wilson, 1999
 Reptoclausa d'Orbigny, 1853
 Reptomultisparsa d'Orbigny, 1853
 Reptotubigera

References

Cyclostomatida